Euchaetis is a genus of plant in family Rutaceae. 

Species include:
 Euchaetis elsieae

References

Zanthoxyloideae
Zanthoxyloideae genera